Pop Pirates is a 1984 British adventure film from the Children's Film Foundation starring Roger Daltrey and George Sweeney.

The term is more commonly used, however, to refer to the pirate rock and roll radio stations that operated off the coast of the UK in the 1960s.

References

External links

1984 films
1980s adventure films
British adventure films
1980s English-language films
1980s British films